Flight 901A may refer to one of two airline flights which crashed, both with fatal results:

Paradise Airlines Flight 901A, crashed on the city of Lake Tahoe, California, United States, March 1, 1964, killing all 85 occupants.
Vieques Air Link Flight 901A, crashed into the Atlantic Ocean off Vieques, Puerto Rico, August 2, 1984, killing all 9 occupants.

See also
Flight 901 (disambiguation)
Flight 191 (disambiguation)
Flight 1 / 001 (disambiguation)
Flight 101 (disambiguation)

0901A